Vineeta Rishi, is an English actress, known for playing Jas Khella in the BBC One soap opera Doctors.

Born in Bracknell, Berkshire to Indian parents, Rishi grew up in Walkergate, Newcastle upon Tyne where she attended Walkergate Primary and Junior School and Benfield School. She then undertook a business degree at the University of Bradford in 1998. After graduation she began working as a computer programmer, including for British Airways in Newcastle Business Park. During her spare time she discovered a passion for acting in Amateur Dramatics, and then choosing to change professions took a postgraduate course at the Mountview Academy of Theatre Arts.

Since graduation she has played PC Kapoor on ITV's The Last Detective, and is regular on the BBC radio soap Silver Street. In 2005 she guest-starred in the Doctor Who spin-off audio drama UNIT: The Longest Night and in 2007 appeared in the television episode Smith and Jones. In 2007 she toured, in the Pravesh Kumar comedy There's Something About Simmy. Rishi played Dona Marina (La Malinche) in BBC2's film "Cortes" which aired in March 2008. In late June and early July 2008, Rishi appeared in the BBC thriller Criminal Justice, playing lawyer Frances Kapoor who is assigned to fight for a murder suspect in court. In 2018, Rishi played DC Rakhee Shah in the British TV drama series Collateral.

Rishi joined the cast of Holby City as Lucky Simpson, a mental health nurse, in November 2020, during the drama's twenty-second series.

References

External links

Living people
Actresses from Newcastle upon Tyne
Actresses from Berkshire
English people of Indian descent
Alumni of the University of Bradford
Alumni of the Mountview Academy of Theatre Arts
British actresses of Indian descent
English television actresses
English stage actresses
1981 births